Szczepkowski is a Polish surname. Notable people with the surname include:

Andrzej Szczepkowski (1923–1997), Polish actor
Władysław Szczepkowski (born 1966), Polish lawyer
Zbigniew Szczepkowski (1952–2019), Polish cyclist

Polish-language surnames